Baron Klas Hansson Bjelkenstjerna (also Claës Hansson Bjelkenstjerna or Bielkenstjerna) (24 April 1615 – 30 July 1662) was a Swedish naval officer and civil servant.

HIs father, Hans Klasson Bjelkenstjerna, who also was a high-ranking naval officer, died when his son was only 5 years old, leaving him to be raised by relatives. Young Bjelkenstjerna soon grew up and followed in his father's footsteps, joining the Swedish navy.

He rose in rank within the navy, being appointed skeppsmajor in 1641. He married baroness Barbro Åkesdotter Natt och Dag in 1643. He participated in the sea campaigns against the Danish and Dutch fleets, in particular Battle of Colberger Heide (1644), and the escape from the Kiel Fjord where the Danish fleet tried to trap the Swedish squadrons. Due to his achievements in battle he was rewarded with a promotion to Admiral-Löjtnant.
 
Years of relative peace followed, with Bjelkenstjerna entering civil service. In 1650, he was appointed to överhovmästare (tutor) for the crown prince Carl Gustav. Queen Christina I granted him the barony of Pyhäjoki in the Northern Ostrobothnia region of Finland. This occurred in the year 1652. The following year Bjelkenstjerna became a member of the Privy Council.

Trivia
 At his deathbed the Swedish king Carl X Gustav called upon his former tutor Admiral Bjelkenstjerna and supposedly bid him farewell with the words: »Farväl, min hederlige Bjelkenstjerna! Tack för hvar dag vi varit tillsammans!» which translates to English as "Farewell, my honourable Bjelkenstjerna! I'm thankful for each day that we spent together!"

References

  Nordisk familjebok, vol. 2 (1878), col. 603f (in Swedish)
  Svenskt biografiskt handlexikon, article Bielkenstjerna, Claës Hansson (in Swedish)

1615 births
1662 deaths
Swedish nobility
Swedish admirals